List of Metropolitan Areas of New Brunswick as defined by Census Canada as of the 2021 Census.

References

Metro